The Moiynkum Desert (Moiynqūm), is a desert in the Turkistan and Zhambyl regions of southern Kazakhstan.

Common plant types in the desert include saksaul, milkvetch, mugwort and sedge. The Andasay State Nature Reserve is a  protected area that was established in 1966.

Geography
The Moiynkum Desert is limited by the Chu River to the north and east and the Karatau and Kyrgyz Ala-Too to the south and southeast. River Chu flows at the northern edge of the desert, with lakes Kokuydynkol and Zhalanash close to the left side of its channel. In wet years it may reach the drainless salt lake Akzhaykyn in the Ashchykol Depression, at the western end of the desert. The Akzhar lake group is located in the southern area.

Climate
The climate of the desert is continental.

Mining
The desert is known to harbor deposits of uranium, with the South Inkai mine of Uranium One and the Inkai Uranium Project of Cameco. The uranium mines at Tortkuduk and Moiynkum are operated by the Franco-Kazakh firm KATCO.

See also
 Geography of Kazakhstan
 Moiynkum District

References

External links

Андасайский заказник
Chu-Talas, Kazakhstan

Deserts of Central Asia
Deserts of Kazakhstan
Deserts of Kyrgyzstan
Jambyl Region